Dalton Paula  (born 1982) is a Brazilian artist. 

His work is included in the collection of the Museum of Modern Art, New York, the Institute of Contemporary Art, Miami, Art Institute of Chicago, and the São Paulo Museum of Art. Paula's work draws on Afro-Brazilian traditions, and features portraits of contemporary subjects dressed in a historical style. Andrea K. Scott, writing for The New Yorker, likened the style to retratos pintados, hand-painted photographs from rural Brazil.

References

Living people
1982 births
20th-century Brazilian male artists
21st-century Brazilian male artists
Portrait artists